Kuwait Airways is the national carrier of Kuwait, with its head office on the grounds of Kuwait International Airport, Al Farwaniyah Governorate. It operates scheduled international services throughout the Middle East, to the Indian subcontinent, Europe, Southeast Asia and North America, from its main base at Kuwait International Airport.

History

The carrier traces its history back to 1953, when Kuwait National Airways was formed by a group of Kuwaiti businessmen; initially, the government took a 50% interest. That year, a five-year management contract was signed with British International Airlines (BIA), a BOAC subsidiary in Kuwait that operated charter flights and provided maintenance services. The carrier transported 8,966 passengers in its first year of operations. In , the name Kuwait Airways was adopted. In , a new contract for management and operation was signed, directly with BOAC this time.

On 8 August 1962, Kuwait Airways became the first foreign customer in ordering the Trident when two aircraft of the type were acquired, and an option for a third was taken. The deal was valued at £5.5 million, and also included a Comet 4C. At the same time, the carrier had also a £3 million order in place for three BAC One-Elevens, with an option for a fourth. In , a second Comet was ordered. On 1 June 1963, the government increased its participation in the airline to 100%. In , the carrier added its first European destination to the route network when flights to London were inaugurated using Comet equipment; from that time, services between London and some points in the Middle East, including Abadan, Bahrain, Beirut, Dhahran, Doha and Kuwait, started being operated in a pool agreement between the carrier and BOAC and MEA. A month later, the airline absorbed Trans Arabia Airways.

In , the route network had expanded to include Abadan, Baghdad, Bahrain, Beirut, Bombay, Cairo, Damascus, Doha, Frankfurt, Geneva, Jerusalem, Karachi, London, Paris and Teheran. At this time, the fleet was comprised two Comet 4Cs, three DC-6Bs, two Twin Pioneers and three Viscount 700s; the carrier had two Trident 1Es and three One-Elevens pending delivery. In the interim, a third aircraft of the type was ordered. On the other hand, the One-Elevens were never delivered: in  the carrier stated that the simultaneous introduction of both types of aircraft was not possible due to a tightened budget, and postponed their delivery; it was informed late that year that the airline would not take them. The carrier made its first profit ever in 1968, with a net income of £910,000.

During 1972, Kuwait Airways'  consecutive profitable year, the airline had a net profit of £2.9 million. By , the fleet had reduced to five Boeing 707-320C aircraft. That year, flights to Colombo were launched. At , Faisal Saud Al-Fulaij, who employed 1,800, was the chairman of the corporation. Kuwait Airways became the Boeing 727s  worldwide customer in 1979, when it ordered three of these aircraft for delivery in late 1980 and early 1981.

By , chairmanship was held by Ghassan Al-Nissef, the number of employees had grown to 5,400 and the fleet comprised eight Boeing 707-320Cs, one Boeing 737-200, three Boeing 747-200Bs and one JetStar; three Boeing 727-200s were pending delivery. In mid-1980, six Airbus A310-200s were ordered to replace the Boeing 707s on routes to Asia, Europe and the Middle East, with deliveries starting in 1983; five more A310 aircraft were added to the order late that year.

After India's air market was deregulated in 1992, Kuwait Airways and Gulf Air participated in the formation of Jet Airways, each holding a 20% equity stake, with a total investment estimated in  million. Following the enactment of a law that banned the investment of foreign carriers in domestic Indian operators, both airlines had to divest their shareholding in the Indian company. Kuwait Airways' 20% stake in Jet Airways was sold to chairman Naresh Goyal for  million.

In , the carrier modified a previous order that included Boeing 747 aircraft, and placed an order worth  million for two Boeing 777-200s, with purchase rights for another aircraft of the type. The operation made Kuwait Airways the  customer of the type worldwide. The airframer handed over the first Boeing 777-200 in early 1998. In December 1998 a code-share agreement was signed with Trans World Airlines to begin in the Spring of 1999.

In October 2007, the new CEO pledged that the airline should be privatised in order for it to compete efficiently against other airlines. He says that the airline will encounter difficulty in advancing, especially in fleet renewal, without the privatisation.

Also in July 2015, the airline restarted flights to Istanbul-Atatürk; the city had not been served for three years.

Corporate affairs and identity

Ownership
Kuwait Airways is wholly owned by the government of Kuwait, .

Privatisation plans 
Privatisation started being considered in the mid-1990s, in a period that followed the Gulf War when the carrier experienced a heavy loss on its assets. The company was turned into a corporation in 2004. A draft decree for its privatisation was approved by the government on 21 July 2008. Plans were to sell up to 35% of the stake to a long-term investor and another 40% allotted to the public, whereas the government would hold the remaining 25%. These plans also contemplated the exclusion of domestic carrier competitors, such as Jazeera Airways, as potential bidders. Furthermore, the government also committed to keep the workforce invariant for at least  years and those who were not to be retained would be offered the opportunity to be transferred to other government dependencies without altering their salaries and holding similar working conditions.

In 2011, the privatisation committee valued the carrier at  million, following advice by the Citigroup, Ernst & Young and Seabury. However, in  that year the committee recommended the airline to go through a reorganisation process before continuing with the privatisation programme, something that was approved by Kuwait Council of Ministers. The privatisation draft was amended and the government signed a contract with the International Air Transport Association for the provision of consultation expertise.

Key people
, Ali Al-Dukhan holds the position as chairman.

, Maen Razouqi holds the position as CEO.

Headquarters
The Kuwait Airways headquarters is located on the grounds of Kuwait International Airport in Al Farwaniyah Governorate, Kuwait. The  head office was built for 15.8 million Kuwaiti dinars (US $ 53.6 million). Ahmadiah Contracting & Trading Co. served as the main contractor. The headquarter was constructed from 1992 to 1996. The construction of the head office was the first time that structural glazing for curtain walls was used in the State of Kuwait. The previous headquarters was on the grounds of the airport.

Subsidiaries and alliances
Kuwait Airways has several subsidiaries that are going through a similar privatization process as KAC.
 Kuwait Aviation Services Co. (KASCO)
 Automated Systems Co. (ASC, شركة الأنظمـــــة الآلية,الأنظمة) GDS provider since 1989
 ALAFCO

Kuwait Airways also went into alliances with several airlines to keep up with demand and to continue its operations during the 1990 War.
 Shorouk Air (ceased operation 2003)
 Jet Airways (India, Temporarily suspended )
 Trans World Airlines (began 1 December 1999 with code share between JFK and Chicago to Kuwait City)

Livery

The airline revamped its livery in October 2016, updating the stylised bird logo.

Destinations 

From its hub at Kuwait International Airport, Kuwait Airways flies to 34 international destinations across Asia, Europe, North America and the Middle East, .

Codeshare agreements
Kuwait Airways has codeshare agreements with the following airlines:

 Etihad Airways
 Ethiopian Airlines
 ITA Airways
 Middle East Airlines
 Oman Air
 SriLankan Airlines
 Turkish Airlines

Interline agreements
Kuwait Airways has interline agreements with the following airlines:

 Air Canada
 Air China
 Air Europa
 Air India
 American Airlines
 Asiana Airlines
 Bangkok Airways
 Biman Bangladesh Airlines
 Cathay Pacific
 China Airlines
 Czech Airlines
 EgyptAir
 Etihad Airways
 Ethiopian Airlines
 Gulf Air
 ITA Airways
 Kenya Airways
 Korean Air
 LOT Polish Airlines
 Lufthansa
 Middle East Airlines
 Nepal Airlines
 Oman Air
 Qatar Airways
 Royal Air Maroc
 Saudia
 Singapore Airlines
 SriLankan Airlines
 Thai Airways International
 Tunisair
 Turkish Airlines
 Ukraine International Airlines
 United Airlines
 Vistara

New York to London route
Kuwait Airways was accused of discriminating against holders of Israeli passports, for refusing in 2013 and 2014 to sell tickets from New York to London to people holding Israeli passports. In response, Senator Richard Blumenthal, along with five other senators, wrote a letter to Transportation Secretary Anthony Foxx in May 2015 urging him to investigate the allegations. In October 2015, at the conclusion of an investigation, the Department of Transportation issued Kuwait Airways an order to "cease and desist from refusing to transport Israeli citizens between the U.S. and any third country where they are allowed to disembark" In the letter, the DOT also accused Kuwait Airways of following the Arab League boycott of Israel. Additionally, New York City Councilmember Rory Lancman asked the Port Authority of New York and New Jersey, which operates JFK Airport, to "terminate the airline’s lease if it doesn’t immediately change its policy". For its part, the airline said that it is in compliance with Kuwaiti Law which prohibits the company from entering "into an agreement, personally or indirectly, with entities or persons residing in Israel, or with Israeli citizenship." The airline also petitioned the Federal Court of Appeals for the District of Columbia to review the dispute.

The matter was settled on December 15, 2015, when Kuwait Airlines informed the United States Department of Transportation that it will eliminate service between JFK and London Heathrow, with The Daily Telegraph reporting that tickets for the route were no longer being sold effective the following week. Councilmember Lancman responded saying "If you’re so anti-Semitic that you would rather cancel a flight than provide service to Israeli passport holders, then good riddance".

In a similar  2017 lawsuit filed by the Lawfare Project, a German court upheld the airline's right to refuse to allow Israelis on an flight from Frankfurt to Bangkok with a layover in Kuwait. In August 2019, Kuwait Airways Chairman Yousef A. M. J. Alsaqer stated that the airlines plans to spend $2.5 billion on new aircraft that due to be delivered by 2026

Fleet

Current fleet

, the Kuwait Airways fleet includes the following aircraft:

Kuwait Airways operates aircraft for official State business. The fleet has a Kuwait Airways inspired livery with State of Kuwait titles, and is composed of one Airbus A300-600, one A310-300, one A319, one A320, two A340-500 and one Boeing 747-8BBJ.

Former fleet

Recent developments

In , Kuwait Airways had one of the oldest aircraft fleets in the Middle East, with an average age of 20 years. That month, the carrier opened its maintenance facilities to the press for them to check that the fleet was kept in condition, amid rumours of deficiencies in their maintenance. In  the same year, the carrier signed a memorandum of understanding with Airbus for the acquisition of  A320neos and  A350-900s. These aircraft would be handed over between 2019 and 2022. For the interim period, the deal includes the lease of seven A320s and five A330-200s from the aircraft manufacturer; deliveries would start in late 2014. The order was firmed up a month later for  billion with deliveries expected to start in November 2016. Kuwait Airways received four leased aircraft of the type, marking the first fleet upgrade in 17 years.

Following the airline's rebranding initiative in October 2016, Kuwait Airways received its first Boeing 777-300ER in December 2016, marking the arrival of the airline's first fully owned new aircraft in nearly twenty years. Introduced in 1995, the Airbus A340-300 was retired from service by the airline in 2017. In October 2018, Kuwait Airways amended a pre-existing commitment with Airbus for 10 A350-900s by reducing it to five of these aircraft, and ordered eight Airbus A330-800s, which were scheduled to be delivered from March 2019. The first two Airbus A330-800s were handed over to the airline by the aircraft manufacturer in October 2020.

Services
Kuwait Airways is one of the few airlines which does not serve alcoholic drinks on its flights.

Incidents and accidents
 On 30 June 1966, Kuwait Airways Flight 032, a Trident 1C flight from Beirut to Kuwait City, suffered controlled flight into the ground four kilometres short of the runway. There were no fatalities and the Trident was written off.
 On 3 December 1984, Kuwait Airways Flight 221 from Kuwait City to Karachi, Pakistan, was hijacked by four Lebanese Shi'a hijackers and diverted to Tehran.
 On 5 April 1988, Kuwait Airways Flight 422 was hijacked from Bangkok to Kuwait with 111 passengers and crew aboard, with three members of the Kuwaiti Royal Family being among the passengers. Six or seven Lebanese men, including Hassan Izz-Al-Din, a veteran of the TWA 847 hijacking armed with guns and hand grenades forced the pilot to land in Mashhad, Iran and demanded the release of 17 Shi'ite Muslim prisoners being held by Kuwait. Lasting 16 days and travelling  from Mashhad in northeastern Iran to Larnaca, Cyprus, and finally to Algiers, it is the longest skyjacking to date. Two passengers, Abdullah Khalidi, 25, and Khalid Ayoub Bandar, 20, both Kuwaitis, were shot to death by the hijackers and dumped on the tarmac in Cyprus. Kuwait did not release the 17 prisoners, and the hijackers were allowed to leave Algiers.
 In August 1990, in connection with the Iraqi invasion of Kuwait, several Kuwait Airways planes were reported to have been seized and removed by Iraqi troops.
 On May 6, 2019, Anand Ramachandran, an Indian technician working for Kuwait Airways, was killed while he was towing  a Boeing 777-300ER. Nobody was on board.

See also
 Transport in Kuwait

Notes

References

External links

 
 

Airlines of Kuwait
Arab Air Carriers Organization members
Airlines established in 1954
Government-owned airlines
Kuwaiti brands
Kuwaiti companies established in 1954